The Biggest Game Show in the World (Greece) is a Greek reality game show based on the French TV game shows, The Biggest Game Show in the World.

The show is supposed to be based on the game show Jeux Sans Frontieres, which was considered the biggest game show in the world with TV projection for over 30 years.

1st Episode 

Wall of champions
The wall of champions is the sixth and final game that brings out the final winner of each episode. the assay of the game split into two groups: the first group involved teams that received with the lowest score, assert the 4th, 5th, and 6th place, while the second group involved teams that received with the highest score and assert 1st, 2nd and 3rd place. the final points of groups corresponds to height on the wall of champions (e.g. if Russia have a final score 18 points, then the pole will be placed at 18 and from there will start the player)

2nd Episode 

Wall of champions 

^Spain lost the second place, because the last player had put the pole in the indication one instead of zero and finally took third place.

3rd Episode 

Wall of champions

4th Episode 

Wall of champions

5th Episode 

Wall of champions 

^Russia lost the first place, because the last player had put the pole in the indication one instead of zero and finally took third place.

6th Episode 

Wall of champions

7th Episode 

Wall of champions

8th Episode 

Wall of champions

9th Episode 

Wall of champions

10th Episode 

Wall of champions

11th Episode (Semi-Final 1) 

Wall of champions

12th Episode (Semi-Final 2) 

Wall of champions

13th Episode (Final) 

Wall of champions

Before you start the game was a draw that will compete in the wall countries. Russia, Spain and France first started and immediately after Kazakhstan, Greece and China started second. The aim was to make the fastest time on the wall. (e.g. if Greece did 1 minute 5 seconds then all countries are champions of the game)(The country reach the finish line with the lowest time is the winner)

References

External links
 http://www.antenna.gr/tv/show?sid=319197 on ANT1
 http://nikosgranturismo5.blogspot.com/2014/02/the-biggest-game-show-in-world-from.html
 http://nikosgranturismo5.blogspot.com

ANT1 original programming
Greek reality television series
2013 Greek television series debuts
2010s Greek television series